Saint Petersburg State University of Economics and Finance (Санкт-Петербургский государственный университет экономики и финансов) is a public university in Saint Petersburg, Russia. It was established in 1930 as Leningrad Institute of Finance and Economics (Ленинградский финансово-экономический институт; hence the colloquial name Финэк (Finec)). In 2012, it united with Saint Petersburg State University of Service and Economics and Saint Petersburg State University of Engineering and Economics to create Saint Petersburg State University of Economics.
The campus of the University occupies the buildings of the former Assignation Bank, which was designed by the Italian architect Giacomo Quarenghi.

History

Leningrad Institute of Finance and Economics (LFEI) was created on the basis of the restructured economic faculty of Saint Petersburg Politechnical Institute on the 3 of June 1930. The first batch of students were admitted to the Institute in September, 1930.

LFEI was enlarged several times, by merging first with the Moscow Institute of Finance and Economics in 1934, then with Higher Institute of Finance and Economics (Leningrad) and Financial Academy (Leningrad) in 1940.

During the World War II the Institute was evacuated first to Essentuki and then to Tashkent. Finec renewed its operations in Leningrad on the 1 of September 1944.

In 1954 LFEI was merged with Leningrad Planning Institute. In 1963 it was named after Russian economist and politician Nikolai Voznesensky. From 1966 to 1991  was a rector of the institute.

On 23 of September 1991, by the decree of the Council of Ministers of RSFSR, N.A. Voznesenski Leningrad Institute of Economics and Finance was renamed Saint-Petersburg State University of Economics and Finance. During the post-soviet years, the University firmly established itself among the leaders of the Russian economic schools, being the first in the official ratings of the Russian Ministry of Education for more than a decade. In October 1991  has become the rector of the University. In December 2006  was elected as the new rector.

At present the university enrolls about 13,000 undergraduate and postgraduate students, who are given instruction at 11 faculties and 40 departments. Every department provides different specializations, the list of which is revised annually in accordance with the changing conditions of the labor market. Its teaching staff numbers 850, 80% of whom have advanced academic degrees. The latest methods of teaching, as well as modern technologies are used in academic instruction.

Campus

The campus being urban, the buildings of St Petersburg State University of Economics and Finance are scattered around the city. There are three dormitories (halls of residence) owned by the university in several areas.

One is situated at Park Pobedy metro station, so it takes about 30–40 minutes to get to university from there. Students pay 55 rubles as a monthly rent but the rate is not fixed and since this year it has become rather high. The students, who do not pay tuition fee, have to pay 2400 rubles per month except for orphans and disabled people who have state benefits and those who have contract with government departments.

The rooms are intended for three, sometimes two or four people of the same gender. The bathrooms and restrooms are situated at the end of the corridors. Kitchens are meant to be for everybody too. There are a few electric stoves and sinks, so that anybody can use them for cooking. Students are not supposed to have microwaves and electric kettles in the rooms as precautionary measures.

Another university dorm is located at Ladozhskaya metro station. The facilities in that dormitory are much better, as it was designed for exchange and foreign students, although nowadays the Russian students who are paying for their education at the university can also live there.

Then there is a dormitory right in the university yard. However, it is being rebuilt now for the use as auditoria.

in 2015 they open a branch in Dubai, United Arab Emirates. Saint Petersburg State Economic University (Dubai branch) is located in Armada Tower at Jumeirah Lake Towers (JLT), Cluster P.

Student life

Students’ Council

The Students’ Council of St Petersburg State University of Economics and Finance is the supreme body of the students’ self-government system, which is independent work of students inside scientific and pastime spheres:

-	It is elected by students
-	It deals with students’ problems
-	It runs the work of other students’ organizations

April Students’ Scientific Research Conference

The University holds Students’ Scientific Research Conference every year discussing the most urgent problems of modern time.

Chronology

Scientific Research Paper Contest

Every year the Scientific Research Paper Contest is held at University.

Students’ Club

The Students’ Club of St Petersburg State University of Economics and Finance is more than 30 years old.

Brain Ring Club of St Petersburg University of Economics and Finance

The club comprising students and alumni aims at developing intellectual games movement at university.

Saint Petersburg Student Initiative Fund

The Saint Petersburg Student Initiative Fund was established in 1997 to promote youth policy in education, science and business and encourage initiative.

AIESEC office

AIESEC unites 23,000 students from 100 countries of the world and collaborates with 3,500 organizations.

Notable people

Vladimir Alkhimov
 was the Head of the State Bank of the USSR.

Yuri Boldyrev
Yury Boldyrev (born on 29 May 1960) is a Russian statesman and publicist. In 1983 he graduated from Leningrad Electrotechnical University (LETI) and then in 1989 from Leningrad Institute of Finance and Economics (LFEI). From 1989 to 1991 he was the People's Deputy of the USSR Supreme Sovyet. He was a member of the Superior Consultative Assembly under the chairman of the Supreme Soviet of Russia from 1991 to 1992.

Irina Eliseeva
 is an economist, PhD in economic science (1974), associate professor of economic science (1984), correspondent member of the Russian Academy of Sciences (1994), Honoured Scholar of the RF (1999), Director of Sociological University of RAS.

She was a student and later became a professor in St Petersburg State University of Economics and Finance. Since 1990 Irina Eliseeva has been the Head of the Department of Statistics and Econometrics. In 2005 Irina Eliseeva initiated the Russian Research journal ‘Finance and Business’.

Svetlana Medvedeva
Svetlana Medvedeva was born in Kronstadt. She graduated from Leningrad University of Economics and Finance.

Now she is the Chair of the Board of Guardians ‘Spiritual and Moral Culture of Rising Generation of Russia’.

Alexey Miller
Alexey Miller is a Russian businessman, Chairman of Gazprom Administration Board, Vice-Chairman of Gazprom Board of directors, PhD in Economics.

He graduated from Leningrad State Institute of Economics and Finance named after N. A. Voznesensky in 1984.

Andrey Illarionov
Andrey Illarionov is a former adviser of the President of Russia.

Alfred Koch
Alfred Koch is a Russian politician and former head of the Federal Agency for State Property Management.

Mikhail Manevich
Mikhail Manevich was born on 18 February 1961 and died on 18 August 1997 who was a vice-governor of St. Petersburg.

In 1983 he graduated from Voznesensky Leningrad Finance and Economics Institute. His master's thesis was about the management in social and economic systems. He was the chairman of the Urban Property Committee of St. Petersburg and a board member of the State Property Committee of the Russian Federation.

In 1996 he became the vice-governor of St. Petersburg. He was one of authors of the current legislation on privatization and participated in the development of government programs of privatisation and housing and municipal reform. On August, 18th, 1997 he was seriously injured and died in hospital.

Tigran Sargsyan
Tigran Sargsyan was a Prime Minister of Armenia in 2008—2014.

From 1980 to 1983, he attended Leningrad Voznesensky Finance and Economics Institute. In 1987 his postgraduate education ended in obtaining a PhD degree.

From 1987 to 1990 he worked as the Chief of Department for Foreign Economic Relations of Scientific Researches Institute of Economic Planning in Armenia. From 1988 to 1993 he worked at the post of the Chairman of republican Council of Young Specialists and Scientists. From 1990 to 1995 he was a member of Supreme Council of Armenia and the Chair of Standing Commission for Financial, Credit and Budget Affairs. From 1995 to 1998 he was the Director of Scientific Research Institute of Social Reforms.

From 1995 to 1998 he was the Chairman of the Armenian Bank Association. Sargsyan occupied the post of the Chairman of the Central Bank of Armenia (CBA) in 1998 and was re-elected by the Armenian National Assembly as the CBA Chairman for a second seven-year term on 2 March 2005. As many as 92 MPs participated in the vote, of which 86 cast their vote for his candidacy. On 9 April 2008 he was appointed as the Prime Minister of Armenia by President Serzh Sargsyan upon the latter's inauguration.

Shamil' Valitov
 was the head of Kazan State Finance and Economics Institute. He graduated from Leningrad Finance and Economics Institute in 1976. Since 1984 after his postgraduate study in LFEI he has been working in Kazan Finance and Economics Institute from junior researcher to professor. In 2000 he became research vice-rector and since 2000 he has been the head of KSFEI. His research findings are being used by such companies as SNEMA, Khimprom, Nizhnekamskneftekhim and many others. He participated in developing the energy saving conception and program in Kazan in 2001.

He was elected a member of the Academy of Labor and Employment in 1999, a member of the Academy of Humanities in 2001, a member of the Tatarstan Republic Academy of Informatization in 2003 and a member of the International Telecommunication Academy in 2005. Valitov was also a member of different government commissions. In 2000 he was awarded the honorary title of the Honoured Economist of the Tatarstan Republic and the Honoured Scientist of the Tatarstan Republic in 2005.

Oksana Dmitryeva
Oksana Dmitriyeva (born on 3 April 1958) is a Russian economist and politician. She graduated from the faculty of economic cybernetics of Voznesensky Leningrad Finance and Economics Institute in 1980. She is an expert on the regional economy. In 1998-1999 she became the professor of St. Petersburg State University of Economics and Finance. She obtained the degree of the Doctor of Sciences in Economics in 1992. She is the author of three monographies and more than sixty scientific works.

Oksana Dmitryeva is the deputy of the State Duma of the Russian Federation.

Boris Pryankov
 (born on 5 February 1940 — died on 31 December 2006), an alumnus of Voznesensky Leningrad Finance and Economics Institute was the Doctor of Economics, the professor, the Honorary Worker of Higher Vocational Training of the Russian Federation. He worked at the Department of Enterprise Economy and Industrial Management for more than 35 years as a teacher and professor. In 1983 Boris Vasilevich Pryankov obtained a degree in Economics. He did research in quality assurance, crisis management, industrial and investment management and published more than 100 scientific works.

Inna Drouz
 (born on 24 June 1979) is a player of the Russian TV Show What? Where? When? and daughter of a famous player Aleksandr Druz. She graduated from St. Petersburg State University of Economics and Finance, Pierre Mendès-France University in Grenoble and Paris Dauphine University. She worked as a leading adviser of the corporate finance department at the Industrial Building Bank, then as an associate professor of the Finance Department in St. Petersburg State University of Economy and Finance.

Dmitry Makarov
Dmitri Makarov is a Russian footballer. He started his career in FC Zenit-2 Saint Petersburg in West Zone second division. Between 2002 and 2004 he played as a forward in the main team. Since 2008 he has headed the teenager team Zenit.

Timur Batrutdinov
 is a Russian comedian and television anchorman, a resident of the ‘Comedy club’. He graduated from St Petersburg State University of Economics and Finance in 2000. Timur Batrutdinov was born on February 11, 1978, in the Tatar family in the village of Voronovo near Moscow. Despite his love to literature and KVN, Timur Batrutdinov became a student of the Department of Human Resources Management at St Petersburg State University of Economics and Finance. As a student, he played KVN and wrote scenarios for the city team. Now besides Comedy Club he is the host of some TV programs and projects.

External links
 Saint Petersburg State University official homepage

References

Universities in Saint Petersburg
Universities and institutes established in the Soviet Union
Universities of economics in Europe
Economics schools